Marco Gomes Rodrigues (born 22 June 1989 in Ribeira Brava, Madeira), commonly known as Marquinho, is a Portuguese professional footballer who plays for CD Ribeira Brava as a midfielder.

References

Marquinho at ZeroZero

1989 births
Living people
People from Ribeira Brava, Madeira
Portuguese footballers
Madeiran footballers
Association football midfielders
Segunda Divisão players
C.S. Marítimo players
PFC Chernomorets Burgas players
A.D. Camacha players
C.F. União players
CD Ribeira Brava players
First Professional Football League (Bulgaria) players
Portuguese expatriate footballers
Expatriate footballers in Bulgaria
Portuguese expatriate sportspeople in Bulgaria